Garry Sitarski (born February 18, 1994) is an American recording artist, singer-songwriter, music director, entrepreneur & Internet personality from New York.

Political activism 
In 2015 and 2016, Garry campaigned for Bernie Sanders in the US Democratic Primaries.

After Donald Trump was elected President in November 2016, Garry held protests in multiple parts of New York State. Garry held his own protest in front of the White House that blocked Donald Trump's car from initially entering. Garry gathered protesters through the use of his social media. Eventually the protest was aggressively pushed away from the white house. Garry interviewed on scene with ABC News, FOX News, & CNN in regards to the protest.

External links

References

1994 births
Living people
Musicians from New York City
21st-century American singers
Singer-songwriters from New York (state)